The 2009 Fórmula Truck season was the 14th Fórmula Truck season. It began on March 8 at Guaporé and ended on December 13 at Brasília.

Calendar and results
All races were held in Brazil, excepting round at Autódromo Juan y Oscar Gálvez, that was held in Argentina.

References

External links
  

2009 in Brazilian motorsport
2009